Old Russell County Courthouse, also known as the Dickenson-Fugate House, is a historic courthouse building located near Dickensonville, Russell County, Virginia. It consists of a simple stone court house built about 1799, attached to the side of a more sophisticated brick farmhouse, which probably dates from the second quarter of the 19th century.  Both sections are two stories and three bays wide and the brick section has a rear ell.  It served as the second location for the Russell County courthouse, until the county seat moved to Lebanon in 1818.

It was listed on the National Register of Historic Places in 1973.

References

County courthouses in Virginia
Courthouses on the National Register of Historic Places in Virginia
Government buildings completed in 1799
Buildings and structures in Russell County, Virginia
National Register of Historic Places in Russell County, Virginia